Bryndís Einarsdóttir (born 29 May 1958) is an Icelandic former footballer who was a member of Iceland's ignaural national team in 1981 where she scored Iceland's first ever goal.

Club career
She played the majority of her career with Breiðablik. In June 1973, she scored 4 goals in Breiðablik's 14–0 victory against Haukar. On 1 September 1983, she arrived to Breiðablik's game against ÍA straight from Keflavík Airport and was substituted into the game when seven minutes into the second half. Despite her late arrival, she netted two goals in Breiðablik's 3–2 victory. In 1984, she moved to Norwegian club Asker where she played until her retirement.

Honours

League
 Icelandic champion (6)
 1977, 1979, 1980, 1981, 1982, 1983
 Icelandic Cup (3)
 1981, 1982, 1983

References

External links
 
 Bryndís Einarsdóttir on Blikar.is 

1958 births
Living people
Asker Fotball (women) players
Bryndis Einarsdottir
Bryndis Einarsdottir
Bryndis Einarsdottir
Bryndis Einarsdottir
Women's association football forwards